Toby Oliver, ACS is an Australian film and television cinematographer best known for his work on over forty films including Get Out (2017), Happy Death Day (2017), and Insidious: The Last Key (2018). Variety named him one of the ten cinematographers to watch for in 2017.

Early life 
Oliver was born in Australia and, after having moved to Los Angeles, California, currently resides in Sydney, Australia.

Filmography

Film

Short films

Television

Web

References

External links 

 

Living people
Australian cinematographers
Year of birth missing (living people)